Percy Douglas Robb  (7 August 1902 - 28 November 1976)   was an Anglican priest: he was the Archdeacon of Kingston-upon-Thames from 1953 until 1976.

Richardson was educated at Bedford School and Pembroke College, Oxford  and ordained in 1927. Following a curacy in Lambeth he was: Rector of St Paul with St Mark, Deptford (1931–44); Rural Dean of Greenwich (1941–44); Vicar of St Mary, Lewisham, (1944–55); Vicar of St Andrew's, Coulsdon, 1955–63; and Proctor in Convocation of Southwark, (1953–75).

References

1902 births
People educated at Bedford School
Alumni of Pembroke College, Oxford
Archdeacons of Kingston upon Thames
1976 deaths